Hans Kuhn (5 December 1919 – 25 November 2012) was a Swiss chemist. He was professor emeritus for physical chemistry and former scientific director  at the  Max Planck Institute for Biophysical Chemistry (Karl Friedrich Bonhoeffer Institute) in Göttingen.

Biography

Curriculum
Hans Kuhn was born in Bern, Switzerland. He studied chemistry at the ETH Zürich and worked for his doctorate at University of Basel under the guidance of Werner Kuhn (not related). He received his habilitation in 1946. From 1946 until 1947 he worked as a post doctoral fellow with Linus Pauling at Caltech in Pasadena and in 1950 with Niels Bohr in Copenhagen. In 1951, he became professor at the University of Basel. He was appointed in 1953  as professor and director of the Institute of Physical Chemistry  of the Philipps University of Marburg where he stayed until 1970. Then he was at the Max Planck Institute for Biophysical Chemistry (Karl Friedrich Bonhoeffer Institute) in Göttingen as director of the department 'Molecular Systems Assembly' until his retirement 1985.

Fritz Peter Schäfer, Horst-Dieter Försterling, Viola Vogel and Dietmar Möbius were among Kuhn's students. Erwin Neher was member in his department 'Molecular Systems Assembly'.

Kuhn married Elsi Hättenschwiler 1948. Their four children were Elisabeth, Andreas, Eva and Christoph. Elsi died 2004.

Scientific research 
Kuhn began to work for his doctorate by investigating decoiling of a random coiled chain molecule in a flowing viscous solvent. Werner Kuhn suggested him to replace the random coil by a dumbbell-model. Kuhn was fascinated by the model's simplicity and by its great success in theoretically analyzing a broad variety of experiments in quantitative terms. This experience and his postdoctoral work with Linus Pauling and Niels Bohr, supported this fascination for powerful simple models and was determining for his life's work in research.

Polymer molecules were described as chains of statistical chain elements. The preferential statistical elements were defined in 1943. Today the preferential element is called Kuhn length, in the recent textbook Principles of Physical Chemistry it is simply called statistical chain element. Kuhn made experiments with macroscopic models of random coils to describe the behavior in flowing liquids more accurately than based on the dumbbell-model.

In Pauling's lab, Kuhn was trying to understand the color of polyenes by describing π-electrons as particles in a box and he was greatly disappointed - it did not work. Later, when applying the model to cyanine dyes he observed a quantitative agreement with experiment. 
Today the model is called free electron model (FEMO). He saw the reason why he had failed in polyenes: an instability when assuming equal bonds leads to an alternation between single- and double-bonds caused by
the condition of self-consistency between bond length and π-electron density distribution. He justified this assumption by finding agreement between measured and theoretically predicted absorption spectra. Later this assumption was theoretically verified.  This effect is often called Peierls instability: starting from a linear chain of equally spaced atoms Peierls considered first order perturbation theory with Bloch functions showing the instability, but he did not consider the self-consistency resulting in the transition to alternation of single and double bonds. The particular properties of conducting polymers are based on the theoretical relation between bond alternation and equalization. The FEMO and its improvements led to a theory on the light absorption of organic dyes.<ref name=Zech>H. Kuhn: The Electron Gas Theory of the Color of Natural and  Artificial Dyes'. Progress in the Chemistry of Organic Natural Products (L.Zechmeister ed.) 16:169 (1958) and ibid. 17:404 (1959).</ref> In Marburg, shortly before the age of digital computers,  Kuhn and Fritz Peter Schäfer developed an analogue computer to solve the 2-dimensional Schrödinger equation. This room-filling analogue computer was applied by Kuhn's research group to calculate bond lengths in π-electron systems.H. Kuhn: Analogiebetrachtungen und Analogrechner zur quantenmechanischen Behandlung der Lichtabsorption der Farbstoffe  Chimia 15:53-62 (1961)H.D. Försterling, W. Huber and H. Kuhn: Projected electron density method of π-electron systems I. Electron distribution in the ground state. Int. J. Quantum Chem. 1, 225 (1967).

In the beginning of the 1960s, Kuhn thought about a new paradigm in chemistry: the synthesis of different molecules which fit structurally into each other in such a way that they form planned functional units (supramolecular machines).  His research group constructed simple prototypes of supramolecular functional units by advancements of the Langmuir–Blodgett films.H. Kuhn, D. Möbius: "Systems of monomolecular layers-assembling and physico-chemical properties" Angew. Chem. Int. Ed. Engl, 10:620–37 (1971). Such films are known today under the name Langmuir–Blodgett-Kuhn-films (LBK-films) or Langmuir–Blodgett-Kuhn-(LBK)-layers. The many different techniques to manipulate systems of monolayers were developed in close cooperation of Kuhn and Dietmar Möbius. Thus the layers should be called Langmuir–Blodgett-Möbius-Kuhn (LBMK)-layers.

In close correspondence to the objective of constructing supramolecular functional units he (now at the Max Planck Institute for Biophysical Chemistry in Göttingen) approached theoretically the origin of life: modelling a hypothetical chain of many small physical-chemical steps that leads to the genetic apparatus. Some steps are of particular significance, such as the step initiating the transition from a multiplication and translation apparatus into a multiplication, transcription and translation apparatus.H. Kuhn: "Model consideration for the origin of life. Environmental structure as stimulus for the evolution of chemical systems", Naturwissenschaften 63:68–80 (1976)H. Kuhn, J. Waser: "A model of the origin of life and perspectives in supramolecular engineering" in: J.-P.Behr (editor): "Lock-and-key principle", Chichester: Wiley 247–306 (1994)H. Kuhn: "Origin of life — Symmetry breaking in the universe: Emergence of homochirality" Current Opinion in Colloid & Interface Science 13:3–11 (2008). This genetic apparatus agrees in the basic structure and in the mechanism with the biological multiplication and translation apparatus. The skill of the experimentalist building supramolecular machines is replaced in life's origin by very particular conditions given by chance in a very particular location on the prebiotic earth and elsewhere in the universe driving the process.

The unifying paradigm has led to construct supramolecular machines and to invent a pathway leading to an apparatus based on the same mechanism as the genetic apparatus of bio-systems. This required thinking in terms of strongly simplifying theoretical models describing complex situations. Important new methods were invented and developed in several laboratories. This caused a divergence - supramolecular chemistry, molecular electronics, Systems chemistry and important contributions to nano-technology.

 Future research will be based on integrating these topics. Having in mind this coherence is stimulating and will be useful. In Kuhn's view these challenging topics should be included in a modern textbook on physical chemistry.

During his retirement, Kuhn developed (with his son Christoph and with Horst Dieter Försterling) his early work on π-electron density (a precursor of the Density functional theory (DFT)) to a very useful approximation called BCD method (bondlength consistent with total π-electron density method). He contributed in understanding Photosynthesis of Purple bacteria, the proton pump of Halobacterium, and the ATP synthase motor.

 Honours and awards 
The items of this list are accessible.

 1949: Werner Preis of the Schweizerische Chemische Gesellschaft (SCG)
 1967: Corresponding member of the Naturforschende Gesellschaft, Basel
 1968: Member of the Deutsche Akademie der Naturforscher Leopoldina
 1972: Liebig Medal of the Society of German Chemists
 1972: Literaturpreis of the Fonds der Chemischen Industrie (with Horst-Dieter Försterling) for Physikalische Chemie in Experimenten 1972: Honorary doctor of Ludwig-Maximilians-Universität München
 1976: Adolf-Grimme-Preis of the 
 1978:  of the University of Münster
 1978: Corresponding member of the Senckenberg Nature Research Society, Frankfurt am Main
 1979: Paul Karrer Gold Medal Paul Karrer Medaille of the Universität Zürich
 1979: Member of the Akademie der Wissenschaften und der Literatur
 1980:  of the  
 1983: Corresponding member of the 
 1989: Honorary doctor of the Philipps-Universität Marburg
 1990: Prix Science pour l'Art Moët Hennessy Louis Vuitton S.A.
 1991: Honorary member of the Deutschen Gesellschaft für Biophysik (DGfB)
 1992: Honorary doctor of the Université du Québec à Trois-Rivières
 1994:  of the 
 1997: Honorary member of the Schweizerische Chemische Gesellschaft (SCG).

 Bibliography 

 The Electron Gas Theory of the Color of Natural and Artificial Dyes. by Hans Kuhn in Progress in the Chemistry of Organic Natural Products ed. Laszlo Zechmeister 16, 169 (1958) and ibid. 17, 404 (1959).
 Praxis der Physikalischen Chemie. Grundlagen, Methoden, Experimente by Horst-Dieter Försterling and Hans Kuhn, 3rd Edition, Wiley-VCH, Weinheim (1991).
 Monolayer assemblies. In Investigations of Surfaces and Interfaces by Hans Kuhn and Dietmar Möbius in Physical Methods of Chemistry Series'' eds. Bryant William Rossiter and Roger C. Baetzold, Part B, Chapter 6, Vol. 9B, 2nd Edition, Wiley, New York (1993).
 Principles of Physical Chemistry by Hans Kuhn, Horst-Dieter Försterling and David H. Waldeck, 2nd Edition, Wiley, Hoboken (2009)

References

External links
 Kuhn's Home page
 Linus Pauling interviewed by Hans Kuhn (English, PDF, 728 kB)

Swiss physical chemists
Swiss educators
1919 births
2012 deaths
ETH Zurich alumni
University of Basel alumni
Max Planck Institute directors